Park Hotel is the eighth studio album by Italian singer-songwriter Alice, released in late 1986 on EMI Music.

The album was recorded with a four-piece band consisting of Italian keyboardist Michele Fedrigotti plus three internationally acclaimed musicians: American bassist Tony Levin (King Crimson, Peter Gabriel, Pink Floyd, Yes, Lou Reed etc.), American drummer Jerry Marotta (Orleans, Peter Gabriel, Hall and Oates, Tony Levin Band etc.) and British guitarist Phil Manzanera (Roxy Music, Bryan Ferry, Brian Eno, Pink Floyd etc.).

Park Hotel which was Alice's first project to be produced by long-time collaborator Francesco Messina, and included the single releases "Nomadi" and "Conoscersi" as well as other popular tracks like "Il senso dei desideri", "Volo di notte", "Viali di solitudine" and "Nuvole rosse", became one of the greatest commercial successes of the singer's career, a Top 20 hit in most parts of Continental Europe as well as Scandinavia (#14 Sweden) and Japan in early 1987. The track "Nomadi" was later covered by Franco Battiato on his 1988 album Fisiognomica.

A re-recorded version of "Nomadi" was included in the 2000 career retrospective Personal Jukebox.

Track listing
Side A
"Il senso dei desideri" (Alice, Mino Di Martino, Saro Cosentino) – 4:12
"Viali di solitudine" (Francesco Messina, Marco Liverani) – 4:04
"Conoscersi" (Francesco Messina, Alice, Marco Liverani) – 3:16
"Città chiusa" (Francesco Messina, Marco Liverani) – 4:21
"Nuvole rosse" (Saro Cosentino, Vincenzo Zitello) – 4:00

Side B
"Luci lontane" (Francesco Messina, Alice) – 5:13
"Nomadi" (Juri Camisasca) – 4:29
"Volo di notte" (Francesco Messina, Alice) – 5:07
"Segni nel cielo" (Francesco Messina, Alice, Marco Liverani) – 4:13

Personnel
 Alice – lead vocals
 Jerry Marotta – drums, LinnDrum programming
 Tony Levin – bass guitar, stick bass 
 Phil Manzanera – guitars 
 Michele Fedrigotti – keyboard instruments, MIDI piano 
 Pietro Pellegrini – Fairlight programming

Production
 Francesco Messina – record producer, musical arranger
 Alice – musical arranger
 Michele Fedrigotti – musical supervision
 Recorded at Lark Studio, Carimate 
 Allan Golberg – sound engineer
 Jim at Logic Studio, Milan – assistant sound engineer
 Benedict Tobias Fenner – assistant sound engineer
 Mauro Stokmajer – technical assistance
 Fabio Montaldi – technical assistance
 Mixed by Benedict Tobias Fenner at Logic Studio, Milan
 Polystudio  – cover design
 Pia Valentinis – artwork
 Fulvio Ventura – photography

External links

1986 albums
Alice (singer) albums
EMI Records albums
Italian-language albums